Cris Kobryn (1952) is an American technologist, system architect and entrepreneur who specializes in advanced software and systems development.

Biography
Kobryn began his software engineering career in the early 1980s specializing in AI programming languages (Prolog, Lisp, CLOS) and applications (expert systems, natural language processing). He led the applications group at Harlequin Limited that developed the Watson investigative analysis application, which was eventually acquired by Xanalys Limited.

Kobryn is best known as an expert in visual modeling languages and model-driven development technologies. In 2003 he founded PivotPoint Technology, a software and systems engineering services company that focuses on model-driven development technologies.
Prior to founding PivotPoint Kobryn held senior technical positions at Telelogic, EDS, MCI Systemhouse, Inference Corporation, Harlequin, and SAIC. Before Kobryn became a software engineer he served as a commissioned officer in both the U.S. Marine Corps and the U.S. Army, and was infantry, armor, airborne and Special Forces qualified.

Kobryn is a member of the ACM, IEEE, INCOSE and AAAI. He chaired large international teams of vendors and users to specify the Unified Modeling Language (UML) 1.1 and UML 2.0 standards for software engineering, and the Systems Modeling Language (SysML) for systems engineering. In recognition of Kobryn's contributions to the UML, the OMG presented him with its Distinguished Service Award in 2000. In recognition of his contributions to the SysML, the INCOSE presented him with its Outstanding Service Award in 2006. In 2007 Kobryn received the SD Times 100 award for the Modeling category on behalf of the SysML Partners open source project that he chaired. 

Kobryn received a BA degree from Colgate University and a BSCS degree from San Diego State University (SDSU). His multi-disciplinary graduate studies at SDSU and UCLA explored the synergies between linguistics, computer science and Artificial Intelligence (AI).

Publications
As an expert in visual modeling languages and model-driven development technologies, Kobryn has published a book and many papers and articles on these subjects.
  
Gogolla, M and Kobryn, C [Eds.] (2001). UML 2001 - The Unified Modeling Language, 4th International Conference, Toronto, Canada, October 2001 Proceedings, Springer.
Kobryn, C (2004). "UML 3.0 and the Future of Modeling", Software and Systems Modeling, 3(1):4–8.

References

External links

PivotPoint Technology corporate bio page for Kobryn
Cris Kobryn's Home Page

Living people
American software engineers
American computer scientists
American technology writers
Colgate University alumni
San Diego State University alumni
University of California, Los Angeles alumni
United States Marine Corps officers
United States Army officers
1952 births
Scientists from New York (state)